The title Countess of Cervera is held by Leonor, Princess of Asturias, heiress to Felipe VI. Cervera is the capital of the comarca of Segarra, in the province of Lleida, Catalonia. The title specifically represents the heir to the Kingdom of Valencia, a part of the Crown of Aragon.

The title was created on 27 January 1353 by Peter IV of Aragon for his son and heir, the infante John, who was later John I of Aragon. The title, which Peter claimed as Count of Barcelona, passed in the Crown of Aragon; it has been united with the Aragonese title Prince of Girona since 1414, after which its history may be traced under that title.  

The Crown of Aragon and its institutions were formally abolished after the War of the Spanish Succession (1702–1713) with the accession of the first Bourbon king of Spain, by the Nueva Planta decrees, under which all the lands of Aragon were incorporated, as provinces, into a united Spanish administration, as Spain moved towards a more centralized government under the new Bourbon dynasty. 

By royal decree from 21 January 1977, the hereditary titles of the former Crown of Aragon have been invested in Don Felipe de Borbón, naming him "Prince of Asturias and other titles historically related to the Heir to the Crown of Spain". In the question of succession the Spanish Constitution of 1978 (Title II, art. 57.2) indicates: "The Heir to the Throne, from his birth or the fact that causes his call, has the rank of Prince of Asturias and other titles traditionally linked to the Heirs to the Crown of Spain".

In 1996, on the occasion of an official visit to Cervera Prince Felipe assumed the title in a public ceremony.

Notes

See also
 Cervera
 Crown of Aragon
 Coat of arms of the Prince of Asturias
 Line of succession to the Spanish Throne
 List of titles and honours of the Heir Apparent to the Spanish Throne

External links
 Official website of the Spanish Monarchy

History of Catalonia
History of the Valencian Community
Spanish royalty
1353 establishments in Europe
14th-century establishments in Aragon